The National Convention was the first republican legislative body of the French Revolution, that lasted from 21 September 1792 to 26 October 1795.

National convention may also refer to:

Bolivia 

 1938 Bolivian National Convention, a defunct national legislature which promulgated the 12th Political Constitution of Bolivia

Canada 
 Newfoundland National Convention, a forum established to decide the constitutional future of Newfoundland

Central African Republic
 National Convention (Central African Republic), a defunct political party

Ghana
 People's National Convention (Ghana), a political party in Ghana

Namibia
 National Convention (Namibia), formed when the International Court of Justice ruled, in 1971, that South African rule in Namibia was illegal

Nigeria
 AKISAN National Convention, the Akwa Ibom State Association of Nigeria

South Africa
 South African National Convention (1908-1909), which settled the terms of the Union

New Zealand 
 New Zealand National Science Fiction Convention, a volunteer-run science fiction convention that is scheduled annually

United Kingdom 
 National Conservative Convention, the highest body of the voluntary wing of the Conservative Party
 National Pensioners Convention, an organisation representing old age pensioners

United States 
 United States presidential nominating convention, a quadrennial convention held by a political party to select candidates for high office in the United States
 Convention to propose amendments to the United States Constitution, one of two legal processes whereby the Constitution, may be altered.

National conventions of specific U.S. political parties
 National conventions of the Communist Party USA
 Constitution Party National Convention
 Democratic National Convention, the national convention of the Democratic Party
List of Democratic National Conventions
 Green National Convention, the national convention of the Green Party
 Libertarian National Convention, the national convention of the Libertarian Party
 Republican Party National Convention, the national convention of the Republican Party
List of Republican National Conventions
 Socialist Party of America
 1919 Emergency National Convention, a seminal gathering in the history of American radicalism, marked by the bolting of the party's organized left wing to establish the Communist Labor Party of America
Whig National Conventions, the national convention of the Whig Party

Other
 List of Delta Sigma Theta National Conventions

See also 
 Convention (disambiguation)
 Political Convention